A weed is a plant considered undesirable in a particular situation, growing where it is not wanted. The concept of weeds is particularly significant in agriculture, where the aim is growing crops or pastures of a single species, or a mixture of a few desired species. In such environments, other plant species are considered undesirable and therefore weeds. Besides, some weeds have undesirable characteristics making them a plant pest in most human settings.

Examples of weeds are plants unwanted in human-controlled settings, such as farm land, orchards, gardens, lawns, parks, residential and industrial areas. Taxonomically though, the term "weed" has no botanical significance, because a plant that is a weed in one context, is not a weed when growing in a situation where it is wanted. In the same way, volunteer plants are regarded as weeds in a subsequent crop. Some plants that are widely regarded as weeds are intentionally grown in gardens and other cultivated settings, in which case they are sometimes called beneficial weeds. The term weed is also applied to any plant that grows or reproduces aggressively, or is invasive outside its native habitat.

More broadly, the term "weed" is occasionally applied pejoratively to species outside the plant kingdom, species that can survive in diverse environments and reproduce quickly; in this sense it has even been applied to humans. 

Weed control is important in agriculture and horticulture. Methods include hand cultivation with hoes, powered cultivation with cultivators, smothering with mulch or soil solarization, lethal wilting with high heat, burning, or chemical attack with herbicides and cultural methods such as  crop rotation and fallowing land to reduce the weed population.

Ecological significance

Certain classes of weeds are ruderals with adaptations that advantages them to certain environments. That is to say: disturbed environments, where soil or natural vegetative cover has been damaged or frequently gets damaged, these disturbances give weeds advantages over desirable crops, pastures, or ornamental plants. The nature of the habitat and its disturbances will affect or even determine which types of weed communities become dominant.

Examples of such ruderal or pioneer species include plants that are adapted to naturally-occurring disturbed environments such as dunes and other windswept areas with shifting soils, alluvial flood plains, river banks and deltas, and areas that are burned repeatedly. Since human agricultural and horticultural practices often mimic these natural environments where weedy species have evolved, some weeds are effectively preadapted to grow and proliferate in human-disturbed areas such as agricultural fields, lawns, gardens, roadsides, and construction sites. The weedy nature of these species often gives them an advantage over more desirable species because they often grow rapidly and reproduce quickly, they commonly have seeds that persist in the soil seed bank for many years, or they may have short lifespans with multiple generations in the same growing season. In contrast, perennial weeds often have underground stems that spread under the soil surface or, like ground ivy (Glechoma hederacea), have creeping stems that root and spread out over the ground.

Some plants become dominant when introduced into new environments because the animals and plants in their original environment that compete with them or feed on them are absent; in what is sometimes called the "natural enemies hypothesis", plants freed from these specialist consumers may become dominant. An example is Klamath weed, that threatened millions of hectares of prime grain and grazing land in North America after it was accidentally introduced, but was reduced to a rare roadside weed within several years after some of its natural enemies were imported during World War II. In locations where predation and mutually competitive relationships are absent, weeds have increased resources available for growth and reproduction. The weediness of some species that are introduced into new environments may be caused by their production of allelopathic chemicals which indigenous plants are not yet adapted to, a scenario sometimes called the "novel weapons hypothesis". These chemicals may limit the growth of established plants or the germination and growth of seeds and seedlings. Weed growth can also inhibit the growth of later-successional species in ecological succession. 

Another of the ways in which the ecological role of a plant can make it a weed even if it is in itself inoffensive, is if it harbours a pest that is dependent on it for survival; for example, Berberis species are intermediate hosts for stem rust fungi, so that they promote serious damage to wheat crops when growing near the fields.

Competition with cultivated and endemic plants

A number of native or non-native plants are unwanted in a specific location for a number of reasons. An important one is functional: they interfere with food and fiber production in agriculture, wherein they must be controlled to prevent lost or diminished crop yields. Other important reasons are that they interfere with other cosmetic, decorative, or recreational goals, such as in lawns, landscape architecture, playing fields, and golf courses. Similarly, they can be of concern for environmental reasons whereby introduced species out-compete for resources or space with desired endemic plants.

For all these reasons, horticultural (both functional and cosmetic) and environmental, weeds interfere by:
 competing with the desired plants for the resources that a plant typically needs, namely, direct sunlight, soil nutrients, water, and (to a lesser extent) space for growth;
 providing hosts and vectors for plant pathogens, giving them greater opportunity to infect and degrade the quality of the desired plants;
 providing food or shelter for animal pests such as seed-eating birds and Tephritid fruit flies that otherwise could hardly survive seasonal shortages;
 offering irritation to the skin or digestive tracts of people or animals, either physical irritation via thorns, prickles, or burs, or chemical irritation via natural poisons or irritants in the weed (for example, the poisons found in Nerium species);
 causing root damage to engineering works such as drains, road surfaces, and foundations, blocking streams and rivulets.

In weed ecology some authorities speak of the relationship between "the three Ps": plant, place, perception. These have been very variously defined, but the weed traits listed by H.G. Baker are widely cited.

Weeds have long been a concern, perhaps as long as humans have cultivated plants. They are mentioned in various historic texts, such as the Shakespearean Sonnet 69:

and the Bible:

Benefits of weed species

{{quotebox
| width = 22em
| align = right
| quote = "What would the world be, once bereft,of wet and wildness? Let them be left.O let them be left; wildness and wet;Long live the weeds and the wilderness yet."| source = — Gerard Manley Hopkins' poem Inversnaid}}

While the term "weed" generally has a negative connotation, many plants known as weeds can have beneficial properties. A number of weeds, such as the dandelion (Taraxacum) and lamb's quarter, are edible, and their leaves or roots may be used for food or herbal medicine. Burdock is common over much of the world, and is sometimes used to make soup and medicine in East Asia. Some weeds attract beneficial insects, which in turn can protect crops from harmful pests. Weeds can also prevent pest insects from finding a crop, because their presence disrupts the incidence of positive cues which pests use to locate their food. Weeds may also act as a "living mulch", providing ground cover that reduces moisture loss and prevents erosion. Weeds may also improve soil fertility; dandelions, for example, bring up nutrients like calcium and nitrogen from deep in the soil with their tap root, and clover hosts nitrogen-fixing bacteria in its roots, fertilizing the soil directly. The dandelion is also one of several species which break up hardpan in overly-cultivated fields, helping crops grow deeper root systems. Some garden flowers originated as weeds in cultivated fields and have been selectively bred for their garden-worthy flowers or foliage. An example of a crop weed that is grown in gardens is the corncockle, (Agrostemma githago), which was a common weed in European wheat fields, but is now sometimes grown as a garden plant.

Dispersal
Many weed species have moved out of their natural geographic ranges and spread around the world in tandem with human migrations and commerce. Weed seeds are often collected and transported with crops after the harvesting of grains, so humans are a vector of transport as well as a producer of the disturbed environments to which weed species are well adapted, resulting in many weeds having a close association with human activities.

Some weed species have been classified as noxious weeds by government authorities because, if left unchecked, they often compete with native or crop plants or cause harm to livestock. They are often foreign species accidentally or imprudently imported into a region where there are few natural controls to limit their population and spread.

Weeds as adaptable species

An alternate definition often used by biologists is any species, not just plants, that can quickly adapt to any environment. Some traits of weedy species are the ability to reproduce quickly, disperse widely, live in a variety of habitats, establish a population in strange places, succeed in disturbed ecosystems and resist eradication once established. Such species often do well in human-dominated environments as other species are not able to adapt. Common examples include the common pigeon, brown rat and the raccoon. Other weedy species have been able to expand their range without actually living in human environments, as human activity has damaged the ecosystems of other species. These include the coyote, the white-tailed deer and the brown headed cowbird.

In response to the idea that humans may face extinction due to environmental degradation, paleontologist David Jablonsky counters by arguing that humans are a weed species. Like other weedy species, humans are widely dispersed in a wide variety of environments, and are highly unlikely to go extinct no matter how much damage the environment faces.

Plants often considered to be weeds

White clover is considered by some to be a weed in lawns, but in many other situations is a desirable source of fodder, honey and soil nitrogen.Woodfield, Derek R. White clover, New Zealand's competitive edge. Symposium NZ Agronomy Society and Grassland Association at Lincoln University, New Zealand, November, 1995

A short list of some plants that often are considered to be weeds follows:
 Amaranth – ("pigweed") annual with copious long-lasting seeds, also a highly edible and resilient food source
 Bermuda grass – perennial, spreading by runners, rhizomes and seeds.
 Bindweed
 Broadleaf plantain – perennial, spreads by seeds that persist in the soil for many years
 Burdock – biennial
 Common lambsquarters – annual
Cogongrass -  Imperata cylindrica - One of the most damaging pest weeds in the world, infesting vast areas in the tropics. 
 Creeping charlie – perennial, fast-spreading plants with long creeping stems
 Dandelion – perennial, wind-spread, fast-growing, and drought-tolerant
 Goldenrod – perennial
 Japanese knotweed
 Kudzu – perennial
 Leafy spurge – perennial, with underground stems
 Milk thistle – annual or biennial
 Poison ivy – perennial
 Ragweed – annual
 Sorrel – annual or perennial
 Striga St John's wort – perennial
 Sumac – woody perennial
 Tree of heaven – woody perennial
 Wild carrot – biennial
 Wood sorrel – perennial
 Yellow nutsedge – perennial

Many invasive weeds were introduced deliberately in the first place, and may have not been considered nuisances at the time, but rather beneficial.

Weed control

Weeds are plants that some people view as undesirable in a particular place. Throughout the long human history of horticulture, people have worked to control weeds for many reasons. Weed control is a highly developed field of knowledge.

Weed control methods vary according to the growth habit of the weeds in question, as well as the context. For example, different methods of weed control may be used on a food crop versus a fiber crop or a golf course, because there is often more concern about health effects of chemicals used on food crops.

Weeds can be categorized by their life habit. They can generally either be grouped as annuals or perennials. An annual weed grows from the seeds dropped in the previous growing season. Perennial weeds regrow from previously established roots, dormant stolons, tubers, rhizomes, as well as the seed.

Understanding the habit of weeds is also important for non-chemical methods of weed control, such as plowing, surface scuffling, promotion of more beneficial cover crops, and prevention of seed accumulation in fields. For example, amaranth is an edible plant that is considered a weed by mainstream modern agriculture. It produces copious seeds (up to 1 million per plant) that last many years, and is an early-emergent fast grower. Those seeking to control amaranth quote the mantra "This year’s seeds become next year’s weeds!". However, another view of amaranth values the plant as a resilient food source.

Some people have appreciated weeds for their tenacity, their wildness and even the work and connection to nature they provide. As Christopher Lloyd wrote in The Well-Tempered Garden'':

History

It has long been assumed that weeds, in the sense of rapidly-evolving plants taking advantage of human-disturbed environments, evolved in response to the Neolithic agricultural revolution approximately 12,000 years ago. However, researchers have found evidence of "proto-weeds" behaving in similar ways at Ohalo II, a 23,000-year-old archeological site in Israel.

See also

 Crop weeds
 Introduced species
 Invasive species
 List of beneficial weeds
 Pest (organism)
 Superweeds
 Vavilovian mimicry
 Vermin
 Volunteer (botany)
 Weed of cultivation

References

External links

 IUCN Invasive Species Specialist Group
 New Mexico State University Weeds Page (includes identification tool)
 New Mexico State University Department of Entomology Plant Pathology and Weed Science
 Global Invasive Species Database 
 "Volunteer Plant" definition 
 Lucid Multi-access key to invasive terrestrial plants in Europe (140 species, 41 characters)
Lucid multi-access key: Weeds of Australia Identification Tool. Queensland Government. (1021 species, 55 characters)

 
Plants and humans
Agricultural pests
Environmental impact of agriculture
Garden pests